Hyperaspis proba, the esteemed lady beetle, is a species of lady beetle in the family Coccinellidae. It is found in North America.

Subspecies
These two subspecies belong to the species Hyperaspis proba:
 Hyperaspis proba proba
 Hyperaspis proba trinifer Casey

References

Further reading

 

Coccinellidae
Articles created by Qbugbot
Beetles described in 1826